The University of the Philippines Mindanao (also referred to as UPMin or UP Mindanao) is a public research university, serving as the sixth constituent unit of the University of the Philippines System. UP Mindanao is the only constituent university of the UP System that was created through legislative action. Republic Act 7889 formally created UP Mindanao on February 20, 1995. The university was later formally recognized as an independent constituent university by the Board of Regents of the UP System on March 23, 1995. Its main focus of education is Mindanao studies through an affirmative action program in the Autonomous Region in Muslim Mindanao to attract Muslims and Lumad students, aside from the marginalized and deserving students. The university was first named University of the Philippines in Mindanao to declare the arrival of the state university in Mindanao after a long period of waiting by eager alumni and students. This was later replaced to its present name due to the request of the UP System for formalities' sake.

The university offers nine undergraduate degree programs and five graduate program heavily inclined in research through its two colleges and one school; the university is the one of its kind in the Philippines to have a discipline in Agribusiness Economics (ABE), and is one of the three worldwide to have such a degree program.

As of 2017, the Philippines' Commission on Higher Education (CHED) awarded a National Center of Development (COD) to UPMin in Information Technology and in Biology education (College of Science and Mathematics). Currently the university is developing itself to become a Center of Culture and Languages, engaging in activities enriching the Filipino and ethnic languages and Mindanao through literature and translation; the university is also a co-founder and active member of the Davao Colleges and Universities Network (DACUN) in the field of cultural integration and development.

The university also aims to become the best science university in Southern Philippines with the UP Mindanao Science and Technology Park Consortium; the university's long-term plan is to transform UPMin to a "green university town," the only one of its kind in the UP system and in the Philippines.

History

A vision of “UP in Mindanao"

There were already stirrings for the establishment of a UP in Mindanao as early as the late 1950s or early 1960s. The UP Alumni Association-Davao Chapter, which was established on December 3, 1949, clamored for the creation of a “UP in Mindanao” for more than two decades; as early as 1961, the UP Summer School already offered extension courses in Law, Business Administration and Education, with the old location of the Davao Central Elementary School as venue. This was then replaced by the short-lived UP Extension Division Davao in 1970. However, in a feasibility study conducted by Hannah et al., it dismissed the idea of creating a permanent constituent campus of UP in Mindanao due to financial concerns.

On November 24–25, 1989, the UPAA Davao Chapter hosted the 12th UP Alumni Institute with Senator Vicente Paterno as keynote speaker. Then UP President Jose Abueva, who attended the conference, was confronted with the strong and united voice of about 630 alumni in attendance as well as media and the business sector, all clamoring for a resolution that would promote the establishment of a "UP in Mindanao" located in Davao City. The resolution was unanimously approved and adopted by the Institute on November 25, 1989. This was submitted to the UPAA national and endorsed by the UP Board of Regents.

The vision of a UP in Mindanao began to materialize when, on the third regular session of the House of Representatives on April 30, 1990. 1st District Representative Prospero Nograles introduced House Bill 13382, also known as "Act to Establish the University of the Philippines in Mindanao". A public hearing on House Bill 13382 was conducted by Senator Edgardo Angara (then Chairman of the Senate Committee on Education) on October 12, 1990, at the Davao Chamber of Commerce. It was sponsored by Representatives Prospero Nograles and Rodolfo del Rosario of Davao del Norte. A strong sentiment for the establishment of a UP in Mindanao pervaded during the public hearing.

To alleviate the strong clamor for a UP Mindanao, Abueva created instead the UP Consortium System, much like the UP Open University. When Abueva's term ended, President Fidel V. Ramos appointed Emil Q. Javier as UP President. It turned out that Ramos had already instructed Javier to create a fact-finding committee composed of Regents Oscar Alfonso, vice-president for Planning Fortunato dela Peña, Atty. Carmelita Yadao-Guno, and Rogelio V. Cuyno, to conduct another study concerning the proposal to create UP Mindanao.

The committee came to Davao for an ocular inspection of the University of Southeastern Philippines (USEP) and Bago Oshiro, Mintal. After receiving the committee report, Javier did not pursue the plan to convert USEP into UP Mindanao due to demonstrations conducted by USEP faculty and staff. Instead, he opted for a congressional action. At the same time, the committee also talked with Bureau of Plant Industry director Nerios Roperos for the segregation of 204 hectares of the BPI area in Bago Oshiro for the UP Mindanao campus. The task of pursuing UP Mindanao was given to Representative Elias B. Lopez, as he is the only UP alumnus among the Davao Representatives.

Establishment

Republic Act 7889, entitled, "An Act Creating the University of the Philippines Mindanao," was finally enacted into law on February 20, 1995, by President Fidel V. Ramos. On March 22 of the same year, the Board of Regents passed a resolution officially creating the University of the Philippines Mindanao. To emphasize the importance of RA 7889 to the Mindanaoans, a re-enactment of the signing was held at the Bangko Sentral ng Pilipinas, with President Ramos himself in attendance. In that same year, Rogelio V. Cuyno was appointed as UP Mindanao's first dean.

The Lee Business Center in Juan Luna Street corner J. de la Cruz Street, and the Casa Mercado Building in Matina served as UP Mindanao's home from March to September 1995 and from September 1995 to January 1996 respectively, until it finally found its home at Ladislawa Avenue.

Because the university then had no disposable land where to construct its facilities, President Ramos signed Proclamation No. 822 reserving 204 hectares of government-sequestered land in Mintal for UP Mindanao. This land was originally owned by the Japanese Ohta Development Corporation and was later returned to the Philippine Government as part of war reparations after World War II.

In June 1996, the College of Arts and Sciences and the School of Management were created. After a year, the CAS was split into the College of Humanities and Social Sciences and the College of Science and Mathematics; the School of Management was retained.

In 1997, the Elias B. Lopez Residential Hall was constructed. It was initially envisioned to be a dormitory for female students, as the one of the existing structures used by UP Mindanao inside the Philippine Coconut Authority (PCA) building was a male-only dormitory.

A period of changes (1998–2000)

On February 20, 1998, the UP Oblation was installed at the Bago Oshiro campus during the university's 3rd Foundation Anniversary. The statue was made by Napoleon Abueva, and is a replica of the original UP Oblation by Guillermo Tolentino. It was accompanied by the UP Madrigal Singers upon its arrival in Davao and was brought to Mintal after a citywide motorcade from Sasa Wharf. It was temporarily installed at the CSM grounds, then later moved to its permanent location at the Oblation Circle, in front of the Administration Building.

The Board of Regents granted full autonomy to UP Mindanao on February 26, 1998, making it the sixth and latest constituent unit of the UP System. Dean Rogelio V. Cuyno, was elevated as its first Chancellor on December 11, of the same year. President Ramos also signed Proclamation Nos. 1252 and 1253 segregating land reservations in Laak, Compostela Valley (2800 hectares), and Marilog District, Davao City (4100 hectares) for research, extension, and instruction purposes.

The respective colleges of UP Mindanao then later found their homes during this year: the School of Management began its occupancy of the Terraza Milesa Building at F. Iñigo Street (Anda Street), while the College of Science and Mathematics and College of Humanities and Social Sciences used the Academic Building I left by the University of Southeastern Philippines. Some classes were still held in the PCA Building, as the Administration Building was being constructed during this period. It was eventually used and occupied in 2000 by the university administration, then later by CHSS in 2009.

The pioneering batch of graduates celebrated their commencement exercises later that year.

The first decade (2000–2010)

The second University Chancellor of the university was Ricardo M. de Ungria, who was installed on September 21, 2001. Under his chancellorship, UP Mindanao co-founded the Davao Colleges and Universities Network (DACUN), Mindanao Science and Technology Park Consortium (MSTPC) and Mindanao Studies Consortium Foundation Inc. (MSCFI). In addition, the Board of Regents approved in 2002 the creation of two offices that delivered UP Mindanao's mandate, the Office of Extension and Community Services (OECS) and the Office of Research (OR). The construction of the Sitio Basak Road, which connects UP Mindanao, and neighboring Sitio Basak, to Mintal and Davao City, was completed in 2006. Initially, this unpaved road, known to the UP Mindanao community as the Abortion Road, was one of the hindrances that students, teachers, and the community had to endure everyday especially during rainy days, when the road was impassable to almost all kinds of vehicles.

The first edition of the university's refereed journal, Banwa, was published in 2004. It was the first major academic journal to be printed in Mindanao. This was then followed by the awarding by the Commission of Higher Education (CHED) to the School of Management's Agribusiness Supply Chain as the "Best Higher Education Research Program" in 2006. The same program won the same award again in 2010.

Gilda C. Rivero succeeded De Ungria as UP Mindanao's third chancellor on July 30, 2007. Her two vice chancellors are Emma Ruth V. Bayogan, Vice-Chancellor for Academic Affairs, and Miguel D. Soledad, appointed as Officer-in-Charge of the Office of the Vice-Chancellor for Administration starting June 2, 2008, with Soledad's appointment eventually approved by the Board of Regents on its 1233rd Meeting. It was during this year when CHED awarded UP Mindanao, specifically its Computer Science program, as a Center for Development in IT Education. The CHED Zonal Research Center was established in UP Mindanao in 2008, focusing on biodiversity and biotechnology research and development.

However, during the first year of Chancellor Rivero's administration, the general tuition fee was increased due to the revision of tuition and other fees (TOFI), resulting in a PhP600-per-unit calculation of matriculation, which infuriated many regular, outgoing and incoming students due to the high fees coupled with miscellaneous fees like cultural and internet fees. Due to increased protests by students and some faculty members, the university was closely guarded by the Philippine National Police, the Army and ROTC corps during the visit of former President Gloria Macapagal-Arroyo during the laying-down of the capsule for the Biotechnology Complex at CSM in 2009; many protesters, mostly from UPMin and some from other universities within the region, rallied at the Administration Building and barricaded Kanluran Road so as to block the passage of the Presidential convoy. Only former UP President Emerlinda R. Roman and DOST Secretary Estrella F. Alabastro were present during the event.

The Centennial Year of the University of the Philippines was celebrated in 2008, with UP Mindanao holding a kick-off ceremony and testimonial dinner as part of its celebrations. In 2009, the Administration Building was completed and its right wing became the residence of the College of Humanities and Social Sciences. In that year, Banwas journal issue on sago (Metroxylon sagu) was named as "Most Outstanding Monograph" by the National Academy of Science and Technology. The CHED Higher Education Regional Research Center for Davao Regional was hosted by UP Mindanao in 2012 for its research program "Sustainable Development of the Philippine Tuna Value Chain."

The House of Representatives, under the Committee on Higher and Technical Education, approved on February 10, 2010, House Bill 3076 (An act providing for the Development Fund for the Medium-Term Development Plan of UP Mindanao) authored by First District Congressman Karlo Alexei B. Nograles providing UPMin with PhP1.2 billion for the construction of vital facilities set out by the UP Mindanao Land Use and Master Development Plan of 2009, including the CHSS and SOM Buildings, Student Dormitory, DOST-SEI-CSM Biotechnology Facility, among others, spread over four years.

During the Kasadya celebrations on December 17, 2010, Bt Eggplant samples planted by the university as part of its scientific research program was uprooted by personnel from the City Agriculturist's Office while the whole community was at the Peoples' Park for the said event. The issue was with the concerns of biological safety of the genetically modified samples to the environment, which was deliberated three months before the said uprooting.

The last year of Chancellor Rivero's term saw the rapid improvement of the road system within UPMin, with the construction of the Mindanao Avenue, which directly connects the Administration Building to Mintal via the Sitio Basak Road and downtown Davao via the Davao-Bukidnon Highway, and the initial repair and construction of the Oblation Circle, due in part to HB 3076. The School of Management's Administration and Corporate Center (SOM Building Phase 1) also reached its final phase of construction in January 2011 and was inaugurated in May of that year. The completion of the SOM Building meant that all of UPMin's three academic colleges are located within its campus at Mintal, Tugbok District, Davao City; the graduate programs of SOM also moved to Mintal.

Twenty years and beyond (2010–present)

During the 1285th Board of Regents meeting on January 24, 2013, the UP Board of Regents selected Sylvia B. Concepcion as the fourth Chancellor of the UP Mindanao. Her term started on March 1, 2013, and ended on February 28, 2016. The turn-over ceremony (and also the testimonial ceremony for Chancellor Rivero) was held on February 22, 2013, and the Investiture Ceremony for the new chancellor was conducted on April 19, 2013, simultaneous with the 16th Commencement Exercises.

During the 31st SR Selection of the General Assembly of Student Councils (GASC) at UP Visayas Miag-ao Campus, former UP Mindanao University Student Council (USC) Chairperson Krista Iris Melgarejo was chosen as the 31st Student Regent of the UP System. She is the first SR to hail from the university. Her term formally started during the June 20 UP Board of Regents meeting.

The construction of the University Main Library began in August 2013, after a prolonged dispute between the university and settler associations living within the university on land ownership issues hampered efforts to immediately construct the building earlier that year. The Main Library was finished in the late quarter of 2014.

UP Mindanao was awarded as the "Best Implementing Agency" during the 25th Founding Anniversary of the Southern Mindanao Regional Research and Development Consortium (SMARRDEC) in 2013. In addition, it also hosted its first international research conference, entitled the International Conference on Agribusiness Economics and Management (ICAEM).

The university celebrated its 20th Foundation Anniversary throughout the month of February 2015 under the theme, "Ika-baynte saulugon, UPMin padayon!" (Celebrate the twentieth, onward UPMin!). One of the main highlights during the month-long celebrations is the bayanihan construction of the Oblation Plaza on February 28 entitled "Isang Libong Alumni Para Kay Oble" (A Thousand UP Alumni for the Oblation), led by the UP Alumni Association-Davao Chapter and various alumni from all UP constituent universities together with members of the UPMin administration, staff, faculty, and students. During this event, the ceremonial lighting of the UP Mindanao Oblation (which was inspired from UP Mindanao's own Torch Night) featured alumni from UP Manila, UP Diliman, UP Los Baños, UP Visayas, UP Cebu, UP Open University, UP Baguio, and UP Mindanao as torchbearers before lighting the cauldron in front of the Oblation.

The Milestones Exhibit featuring the academic regalia of the four chancellors, a photo exhibit of historical events, and a roster of achievements, was displayed in the Administration Building throughout the whole month. The main academic symposium, Science for Society, was on February 16, with DOST Undersecretary Amelia Guevara as the keynote speaker. Week-long celebrations and events for each of university's colleges was also observed, with CHSS celebrating its anniversary on the first week, CSM on the second week, and SOM on the last week. The Students' Week and Dorm Week were held on the third week, featuring events and contests from various student organizations, the highlight of which is Tatak UPMin on February 27. All of these academic and recreational events were open to the public.

In 2019, former School of Management (SOM) dean Larry N. Digal was appointed by the Board of Regents as the fifth chancellor of UP Mindanao, from March 1, 2019, to February 28, 2022. His term show the rapid expansion of the university's academic, research, and public service offerings, including the institution of two new degree programs (Associate in Sports Studies under the College of Humanities and Social Sciences, and Ph.D. in Management under the School of Management), the conferment of 14 new faculty and several administrative items, and the continuing infrastructure development in the campus; the CHSS Cultural Complex, EBL Residential Hall Annex, Center for Advancement of Research in Mindanao (CARIM) Building, and the operational completion of the Davao City-UP Sports Complex happened under his term. During Digal's term, the university saw its highest student population to date: 1,355 students consisting of 1,194 undergraduate and 161 graduate students. Amidst these successes, his term witnessed the COVID-19 pandemic and its effects to university operations, with the university responding to the health crisis through a shift to remote learning, intensified research and public service activities related to the pandemic, and allowed the City Government of Davao to use its Faculty & Staff Housing building and the Athletic Gymnasium in the Davao City–UP Sports Complex as isolation facilities for light to moderately-affected patients.

On February 24, 2022, Philippine Genome Center-Mindanao (PGC-Mindanao) director Lyre Anni E. Murao was named by the UP Board of Regents to succeed Digal as the sixth Chancellor of UP Mindanao during its 1368th meeting; her term will run from March 1, 2022, to February 28, 2025.

Organization

Administration

UP Mindanao is governed by the 11-member Board of Regents composed of the UP President, the Chairman of the Commission on Higher Education (CHED), the chairpersons of the Committee of Higher Education of the Senate and the House of Representatives, four regents representing the student, faculty, alumni and staff sectors, and three regents who are appointed by the President of the Philippines.

The university is directly administered by the Chancellor, assisted by the Vice Chancellors for Academic Affairs and Administration.

The University Council is composed of the chancellor, university professors, professors, associate professors, and assistant professors of the various degree-granting units of that university. The Chancellor serves as Chairperson and the University Registrar as Secretary.

The council has the power to prescribe the courses of study and rules of discipline, subject to the approval of the Board of Regents. The council is also authorized to fix the requirements for admission to any college of the university as well as those for graduation and the receiving of a degree. The council is empowered to recommend to the Board of Regents students or others to be recipients of degrees. The Council exercises disciplinary power over the students through its Chancellor or Executive Committee within the limits prescribed by the rules of discipline approved by the Board Regents.

The Executive Committee, which counts as members the Deans of the various degree-granting units of the constituent university as well as the heads of administrative offices, also acts in an advisory capacity to the Chancellor in all matters pertaining to their offices for which they seek its advice.

The President of the university is an ex officio member of the University Council of each constituent university and presides over its meetings whenever present.

Colleges and degree-granting Units

UP Mindanao is divided into two colleges and one school: the College of the Humanities and Social Sciences (CHSS), focusing on the cultural diversity of Mindanao through the study of humanities and social sciences; the College of Science and Mathematics (CSM), studying the endemic flora and pioneering scientific development in the fields of biology, food science, applied mathematics, and computer science; and the School of Management (SOM), which undertakes research on supply chain management and agribusiness economics.

Degree-granting unitsCollege of Humanities and Social Sciences Department of Architecture
 Architecture
 Urban and Regional Planning
 Department of Humanities
 Communication and Media Arts
 Communication theory
 Communication research
 Media Arts
 Speech and Corporate Communication
 Creative Writing
 English literature
 American literature
 Filipino literature
 Foreign languages
 Japanese
 Department of Human Kinetics
 Physical Education
 Exercise and Sports Science
 UP Mindanao Varsity Teams
 Football
 Basketball
 Volleyball
 Chess
 UP Mindanao Dance Ensemble
 National Service Training Program
 Department of Social Sciences
 Anthropology
 Linguistics
 Psychology
 Social SciencesCollege of Science and Mathematics Department of Biological Sciences and Environmental Studies
 Animal Science
 Biology
 Crop Science
 Ecology
 Microbiology
 Wildlife
 Zoology
 Department of Food Science and Chemistry
 Chemistry
 Food Science and Technology
 Department of Mathematics, Physics and Computer Science
 Applied Mathematics
 Data Analytics and Data Studies
 Computer Science
 Applied Machine Learning and Artificial Intelligence
 PhysicsSchool of Management Agribusiness Economics
 Supply Chain Management

Campus

Even before the establishment of UPMin, Barangay Mintal and Barangay Bago Oshiro, are known for its agriculture research centers. The Philippine Science High School Southern Mindanao Campus at nearby Barangay Sto. Niño and the Mindanao Science Centrum at Barangay Bago Oshiro further define the area as a "academic and research hub".

With the establishment of UPMin in Mintal, this sleepy barangay has been rapidly turned into a small university town within Davao City, with businesses and establishments built around the university accommodating to the needs of the students and faculty. Furthermore, the UP Mindanao Land Use and Master Development Plan aims to create UP Mindanao a "Green University Town", being a "garden" campus with emphasis on the Mindanaoan culture, with each building reflecting each ethnolinguistic group in Mindanao

ExistingOffice structures Administration Building (Admin) – houses most administrative offices, as well as housing the College of Humanities and Social Sciences (CHSS) and School of Management (SOM) classrooms and offices. Designed by Francisco C. Santos, Jr. after the Quezon Hall (Administration Building) of UP Diliman, and is inspired by Bagobo architecture and design (notably on the façade and floor tiles).
 Center for the Advancement of Research in Mindanao (CARIM) Building – office building for CARIM, formerly the Office of Research.
 Human Kinetics Center (HKC) – located east of the Administration Building, originally housed the Department of Human Kinetics, classrooms for physical education classes, a dance hall used by the UP Mindanao Dance Ensemble, a table tennis hall, a gym, and a faculty room. Donated by Senator Robert Jaworski in 2003 (to which it was also called "Jaworski Hall" after its completion). Currently used by the Physical Plant Office (PPO).Academic structures Academic Building I (Kanluran) – houses the College of Science and Mathematics (CSM) and the DOST-SEI Regional Biotechnology Laboratory; first constructed by the University of Southeastern Philippines (USEP) and later renovated and refurbished by UP Mindanao. Aptly named "Kanluran" due to its western location in the map, and because of an urban legend surrounding the building itself.
 School of Management Building Phase 1 (SOM) – houses the School of Management's (SOM) administration and staff. Also houses classrooms and a large audio-visual room.
 CHSS Cultural Complex – located 800 meters from the Human Kinetics Center, the CHSS Cultural Complex serves as the college's main edifice, housing an open-air amplitheater, mini-audio visual room, the Communication Arts laboratory, Mindanao Studies Program (MSP) Gallery, Architectural Heritage Gallery, a conference room, and workshop areas.
 University Main Library (Main Lib) – the University Library houses the Main Library and the Office of the University Librarian, as well as a gallery, records room, audio-visual room, reading areas, internet and multimedia rooms, and business areas for the UP Press bookstore and refreshments.Residential structures Elias B. Lopez Residential Hall (EBL Hall, Dorm) – houses the Student Housing Services office, dormitory rooms (which houses about 250 occupants), dormitory clinic, and the Interactive Learning Center. Named after Congressman Elias B. Lopez, the so-called "Father of UP in Mindanao" for being the main proponent for the establishment of UPMin. The EBL Hall also houses the offices for the Student Housing Section of the Office of Student Affairs, and the Interactive Learning Center – Learning Resource Center (ILC–LRC).
 EBL Science and Technology Dormitory (Dorm Annex) – located at the CSM Complex, houses dormitory rooms for CSM students (around 50 occupants).
 EBL Residential Hall Annex – new residential building with more dormitory rooms, classrooms, and office spaces.
 Faculty and Staff Housing – residential building for faculty and staff with residences outside Davao City.Kalimudan Student Center (Kalimudan) – opened in August 2010, Kalimudan houses commercial establishments, offices, and related facilities
 University Student Council (USC) House – main office of the UP Mindanao University Student Council; also used by major student organizations for meetings and forums.
 Himati Office – main office of Himati, the official student publication of the University of the Philippines Mindanao.
 Covered gymnasium DFSC Sago Laboratory – research facility for food technology projects related to sago processing and sago flour production; managed by the Department of Food Science and Chemistry (DFSC) of the College of Science and Mathematics.
 UPMin Infirmary – donated by the Beta Sigma Fraternity through the Betans Spirit Foundation; caters the medical needs of UP Mindanao constituents and of the neighboring communities of Bago Oshiro and Sitio Basak.Road Network Mindanao Avenue – inspired from UP Diliman's University Avenue, the Mindanao Avenue connects the Administration Building directly into the road network of Sitio Basak and Mintal.
 Oblation Plaza – the Oblation Plaza enshrines the Oblation statue that is the iconic figure of the UP System. This is one of the pioneer projects of the UP Alumni Association-Davao Chapter through a bayanihan construction project entitled Isang Libong Alumni Para Kay Oble on February 28, 2015.
 Maguindanao Road (Kanluran Road) – the largest and the main road in the university; connects the Administration Building and EBL Dorm with Kanluran. Has a distance of 1.1 kilometers (from Admin to Kanluran).

Under development
 Davao City-UP Sports Complex – the DC-UP Sports Complex has been envisioned by the City Government of Davao and UP as a regional sports facility based on international standards. It contains a training and athletic gymnasium, football stadium with oval track, an aquatic center for swimming events, training rooms and facilities, and offices and classrooms for the Department of Human Kinetics, later to be handed to the College of Human Kinetics. It is found on a 20-hectare site two kilometers away from the Administration Building.

 UP Mindanao Health Center Davao City Public Hospital
 Mindanao Research and Innovation Center for One Health
 Center for Infectious Diseases
 Philippine Genome Center–Mindanao Building

 UP Mindanao Botanical Garden Cultural parks
 Central Park – greenery behind the Administration Building and Main Library
 Mindanawon, Islamic, Chinese, Japanese
 Convergence Park
 Carillion Plaza – proposed roundabout 
 Religious buildings (Roman Catholic, Islam, interfaith)
 Open-air amplitheater

 Academic Core College of Humanities and Social Sciences Complex CHSS Academic Building
 College of Science and Mathematics Complex Philippine Genome Center – Mindanao (PGC–Mindanao) Center
 School of Management Complex SOM Building Phase 2
 Future College of Human Kinetics College of Human Kinetics Building

 Mindanao Research and Development Center CARIM Building Phase 2

 Knolwedge, Innovation, Science, and Technology Park (KIST Park) – future complex for science, technology, and engineering activities; jointly sponsored by UP Mindanao and the Kitakyushu Science and Knowledge Park.

 Road and pedestrian network Mindanao Ring – circumferential pedestrian road connecting all academic complexes, the Administration Building, and Main Library
 Cultural Walk – concrete-paved pathwalks featuring textile patterns from selected Mindanawon ethnolinguistic groups
 protected walkways
 bikeways

 Executive Housing facilities Commercial facilitiesRetired
 Ladislawa Campus – located inside Ladislawa Village, it housed the first administrative offices of UP Mindanao.
 Lee Business Corner – housed the first administrative offices and classrooms of UP Mindanao.
 Casa Mercado Building – located in Matina, this was used as an extension building for the administration.
 Philippine Coconut Authority (PCA) Dormitory – located in Bago Oshiro, a few structures within the area were used by UP Mindanao as male-only dormitory and educational center, where the first lecture classes were held.
 Old SOM Building (UP Mindanao City Campus, UP Anda) – located in F. Iñigo Street (formerly Anda Street) in downtown Davao City, This building was an old hotel rented by the former UPMin Administration for their offices and an extension campus while they moved from the old Ladislawa campus. It was used to hold classes for the School of Management (SOM) major subjects and master's degrees courses, and the UP Open University Davao office was also located there. Upon the completion of the SOM Building at the main campus, the remaining facilities were moved into the new SOM Building at Mintal. The UPOU Davao Office moved to a nearby building where the UP Alumni Association-Davao Chapter office is located.
 Old Main Library Building (Main Lib)''' – formerly the UP Mindanao Cultural Center. This small building was the old "convenience center" by the 66th Engineering Brigade, given to UPMin when the former left Mintal for deployment. It houses the main book collections of the university and the School of Management (SOM) library. In 2011, due to the construction of the Mindanao Avenue, the structure was demolished and its contents moved to the Interactive Learning Center-Learning Resource Center building (ILC-LRC), Elias B. Lopez Residential Hall, and Kalimudan Student Center while the new University Library was being constructed.

Student life

As with the other UP units, the university is home to many student organizations that sponsor many activities, most notably during the month of August, September, December and February. These organizations also foster camaraderie and excitement in a major university that is quite distant from downtown Davao.

Like in UP Diliman, UPMin has its own jeepney transportation network called “UPMin Ikot” (similarly named after UP Diliman's own "Ikot" and "Toki" jeepney networks) supported by motorcycles called "single motorcycles" or "habal-habal", and covered tricycles called "payong-payong" or "princess". They usually use the Admin-Kanluran, Admin-Sitio Basak, Admin-Mintal and Kanluran-Mintal routes. In 2012, a proposal has been submitted to the Land Transportation Franchising and Regulatory Board (LTFRB) to create a formal jeepney route from UP Mindanao to Mintal. This route, also called "UPMin Ikot", travels from the College of Science and Mathematics (Kanluran), Administration Building (Admin/CHSS), Sitio Basak (stopping by at the nearby dormitories and boarding houses), downtown Mintal, then finally at the Holy Spirit Hospital, where the public transportation system connects the university to downtown Davao through the Calinan-Mintal-Roxas Avenue jeepney route. This was formally opened to the public on February 1, 2013, as part of the university's Foundation Month celebrations.

Special events
Due to the efforts made by the students and academe, and due in part to its isolation to urban Davao, UP Mindanao's youth as a constituent unit has been offset by its efforts to become a cultural melting pot in the whole Mindanao region. Most of the traditions practiced were borrowed from other constituent units, but were given Mindanaoan elements. Because of these, such events draw an enormous crowd not only from the student and employee body, but also from other schools and universities as well.

Most of the events are organized by the UP Mindanao University Student Council (USC) and student organizations through the coordination and support of the Office of Student Affairs (OSA); other events are also hosted by program-based student organizations, fraternities, and sororities.

University convocation
During the first day of classes for every academic year, the whole community gathers at the Atrium to welcome the freshmen with an acquaintance ceremony, in which members of the administration, faculty, heads of the colleges, staff and students are introduced. An invited guest speaker will then give an inspirational message for the new members of the student body. The freshman with the highest University-predicted Grade (UPG) will then give his/her message on behalf of the batch and lead them during the oath-taking. The elected University Student Council officials are also inaugurated during the program after they were elected during the previous academic year.

Torch Night
Usually done weeks after the formal opening of classes, the Torch Night involves the symbolic passing of the lit torch, symbolizing responsibility and privilege as "Iskolar ng Bayan", by the upperclassmen, represented by the bloc leaders of the earlier freshmen batch, to the current bloc leaders of the freshmen batch of each degree program. They then pledge their oath of loyalty and responsibility to the university and to their fellow schoolmates. A competition of group presentations between freshmen is also part of the event.

Freshmen Night
One of the highlights during the academic year, the Freshmen Night is held a month after the Torch Night, where all freshmen, with the help of their upperclassmen, compete in a pageant (Search for UPMin Isko and Iska) and a dance competition. In 2011, it was celebrated together with the Torch Night but was reinstated as a separate activity in 2013.

Freshmen Torch Night
In an effort to make the experience of welcoming the new students better, the Freshmen Torch Night has been organized in 2011 until the following year. This event combined the fanfare of welcoming the freshmen during Torch Night and the pageantry of the Freshmen Night. The event's highlights include the passing and lighting of the degree program torches and group presentations from the freshmen (taken from the Torch Night) and the Search for the Ultimate Isko and Iska of UP Mindanao (Freshmen Night).

Dula
Dula, a Cebuano word meaning "play", is the university-wide sportsfest, preceded by the college-based sportsfests Dula-dula for CSM and SOM, and Hampang for CHSS (both words mean "play" in the Cebuano and Hiligaynon/Ilonggo languages). Done usually in the middle of the first semester of the academic year two weeks before the moratorium, students get together with their teachers in the spirit of enjoyment, sportsmanship and camaraderie. The highlight of the competitions is the Cheerdance Competition, the climax of intercollegiate rivalry between CHSS, CSM and SOM, drawing huge crowds from other universities and is commonly featured in the local media.

Deviance Day
Deviance Day is organized by the College of Humanities and Social Sciences (CHSS) under the Department of Social Sciences (DSS) and the Dalub-aral na may Ugnayan, Galing at Organisadong Ningas na Ginagabayan ng Antropolohiya (DUGONG-ANTRO) student organization. It is an adaptation of UP Cebu's "Crazy Day" and was originally a free concert hosted by the BA Social Sciences and BA Anthropology programs.

Throughout the day, participating students, faculty and staff would dress up with their "not-so-everyday" attires. Many would copy the look of their favorite movie/cartoon/book characters, some would dress up in formal attire, others try to cross-dress, some do cosplay, and a brave few would enter classes with little clothing at all. In the evening, a program is held which consists of talent shows, a presentation of the best-dressed people during the day, and a free concert, participated by musical bands within the university.

Kasadya
A Cebuano word meaning "joy or happiness," Kasadya is the highlight of the university-wide Christmas celebration that starts during December and continues through the month. It features a lantern parade made by the university constituents and other sectors in UP Mindanao, and Pasiklaban, a skit contest for students and alumni sponsored by the UP Alumni Association-Davao.

In 2010, the Christmas celebrations were officially opened with the lighting of the University Christmas Tree, constructed with lanterns from the different student organizations, at the Kalimudan Student Center, and the culminating program and lantern parade was held at Peoples' Park in Davao City. Since 2011, the celebrations for Kasadya were held inside the campus.

UP Mindanao anniversary celebrations
A month-long event, this commemorates the foundation of UP in Mindanao as a constituent university with the UP System on February 20. Cultural and civic events are conducted during this time, spearheaded by the administration. The colleges also celebrate their foundation weeks during this period (namely CHSS Week and CSM Week). The respective degree programs also hold their own events within their college's week, such as BACA Night by the BA Communication Arts program and Communicators' Guild, and CSM Night, organized by the CSM Student Council.

Residents of the Elias B. Lopez Hall also celebrate their Dorm Week during this period, with events such as workshops, talkshows, quiz bees, the Open House (where students not living inside the dormitory can enter the rooms of dormers throughout the day), competitions for the cleanest and best-decorated rooms, and the much-awaited Mistress of the Dorm, a beauty pageant of cross-dressing male dormers.

UP Fiesta is the umbrella event organized by the University Student Council, held on the first week of the anniversary. It includes guided tours throughout the university for invited high school students, talent shows, and a market fair participated by several student organizations which lasts until the following week's Orgs Fair, which is also another event where student organizations get to promote their activities to other students and organizations. Other activities include foundation celebrations by several student organizations, and the Tatak UPMin, which consists of a beauty pageant (Mistress and Master of UPMin) of male and female students from the different student organizations cross-dressing into their alter-egos, and a musical competition of bands (Battle of the Bands).

Honorable students, faculty and staff are given recognition during Recognition Day, held on February 20, the exact date when UP Mindanao was founded in 1995.

The annual alumni homecoming held during this period has been named Panagtagbo, which means "gathering" in the Cebuano language. This event aims to gather the former students, faculty, and staff of UP Mindanao since its institution in 1995, and offers an avenue for them to reunite with their former classmates, schoolmates, professors, and the university. It also includes musical presentations by Alagad ni Oble'', one of the first musical bands established in the university, and dance concerts by invited party DJs. It was only in 2013 when the event was formally included in the formal lineup of activities throughout the month, and was given a name by the alumni.

Housing

The Elias B. Lopez Hall (EBL Hall) serves as the student residence center of the university, administered by the Student Housing Section (SHS) under the Office of Student Affairs (OSA). Most residents are freshmen and upperclassmen with home residences outside Davao City. In addition, the Science and Technology Dormitory (the Dorm Annex) caters to students from the College of Science and Mathematics, especially those conducting their undergraduate theses, research works, and other related activities.

Several dormitories, apartments, and shared residences are also near the campus, located mostly at Sitio Basak and Mintal.

See also
 State Universities and Colleges (Philippines)
 List of University of the Philippines people
 University of the Philippines Baguio
 University of the Philippines Manila
 University of the Philippines Los Banos
 University of the Philippines Cebu
 University of the Philippines Visayas

References

External links

 University of the Philippines system
 University of the Philippines Mindanao
 University of the Philippines Mindanao YouTube page

M
State universities and colleges in the Philippines
Universities and colleges in Davao City
Research universities in the Philippines